The Rural Municipality of Miry Creek No. 229 is a rural municipality (RM) in the Canadian province of Saskatchewan within Census Division No. 8 and  Division No. 3.

History 
The RM of Miry Creek No. 229 incorporated as a rural municipality on January 1, 1913. The first homestead occurred in 1907. The Canadian Pacific Railway expanded westward in the RM from Cabri in 1913.

Geography

Communities and localities 
The following urban municipalities are surrounded by the RM.

Villages
Abbey
Lancer

The following unincorporated communities are within the RM.

Special service areas
Shackleton

Localities
Abbey Colony
Wheatland Colony.

Demographics 

Economy 
Agriculture and natural gas are the major industries in the RM.

Government 
The RM of Miry Creek No. 229 is governed by an elected municipal council and an appointed administrator that meets on the second Thursday of every month. The reeve of the RM is Mark Hughes while its administrator is Karen Paz. The RM's office is located in Abbey.

References 

M